Gambold is a surname. Notable people with the surname include:

Fred Gambold (1868–1939), American film actor
Bob Gambold (1929–2008), American football player and coach